The Ensign C. Markland Kelly Jr. Award is presented annually by the USILA to the top college goaltender in NCAA Divisions I, II, and III. Johns Hopkins has won the most awards, with 14. Starting in 1990, the award has also been presented to the top women's goaltender in NCAA Divisions I, II & III. The top high-school player in Maryland lacrosse is also given an award in his honor. His name is also on various dedications throughout Baltimore. The Gilman School's weight training facility is named after him, as is the McDonogh School's football field.
								
The award is named for Charles Markland Kelly Jr., a native of Baltimore who attended Friends School of Baltimore, Gilman School, and McDonogh School and was a standout goalie for the University of Maryland lacrosse team until October 1940. At that time, with World War II imminent, he left school to become a pilot in the US Navy. In August, 1941, he received his wings and was commissioned an ensign. Flying a Grumman F4F Wildcat on an escort mission for the carrier's bombers at the Battle of Midway, he failed to return from the initial strike, and was reported missing in action on June 4, 1942.

In memory of his son, Mr. Kelly Sr. established the Ensign C. Markland Kelly Jr. Memorial Foundation.  The foundation provided the initial funding for the U.S. Lacrosse Hall of Fame, and presents annual awards for outstanding high-school and college lacrosse players.  The foundation has also provided grants for schools, colleges, youth programs and other civic and cultural institutions, as well as funding for American Legion posts, one of which has been named in his honor.

Men's Award Winners

By University

Women's Award Winners

By University

See also

References

External links
US Lacrosse Awards page

College lacrosse trophies and awards in the United States
Kelly